The 1974 Dayton Pro Tennis Classic, was a men's tennis tournament played on indoor carpet courts at the Dayton Convention Center in Dayton, Ohio, in the United States. It was an independent event, i.e. not part of a tour or circuit. It was the inaugural edition of the event and was held from January 30 through February 2, 1974. First-seeded Raúl Ramírez won the singles title and earned $5,000 first-prize money.

Finals

Singles
 Raúl Ramírez defeated  Brian Gottfried 6–1, 6–4, 7–6(7–1)
 It was Ramírez' 1st singles title of the year and the 2nd of his career.

Doubles
 Ross Case /  Geoff Masters defeated  Brian Gottfried /  Dick Stockton 6–4, 6–7, 7–6

References

Dayton Pro Tennis Classic
Dayton Pro Tennis Classic
Dayton Pro Tennis Classic